Following is a list of pantheons of deities in specific spiritual practices:

 African pantheons
 Armenian pantheon
 Aztec pantheon
 Buddhist pantheon
 Berber pantheon
 Burmese pantheon
Canaanite pantheon
 Celtic pantheon
 Chinese pantheon
 Egyptian pantheon
 Germanic pantheon
 Greek pantheon
 Guanche pantheon
 Hindu pantheon
 Incan pantheon
 Irish pantheon
 Jain pantheon
 Japanese pantheon
 Japanese Buddhist pantheon
 Maya pantheon
 Native American pantheons
 Norse pantheon
 Rigvedic pantheon
 Roman pantheon
 Slavic pantheon
 Sumerian pantheon
 Yoruba Pantheon

See also
 Divine Council
 Mesopotamian myths
 William Blake's mythology

Pantheon